The 1989 Colonial Athletic Association men's basketball tournament was held March 4–6 at the Hampton Coliseum in Hampton, Virginia. 

George Mason defeated  in the championship game, 78–72, to win their first CAA men's basketball tournament. The Patriots, therefore, earned an automatic bid to the 1989 NCAA tournament, their first-ever NCAA tournament bid.

Bracket

References

Colonial Athletic Association men's basketball tournament
Tournament
CAA men's basketball tournament
CAA men's basketball tournament
Sports competitions in Virginia
Basketball in Virginia